Маsanchi is a Kazakhstani village in the Korday District of the Jambyl Province. The village is located near the border with Kyrgyzstan, is approximately 45 kilometers southeast of the village of Korday, and approximately 130 kilometers southwest of Almaty.

The village has also been reported as having a large amount of ethnically Dungan people (people of Hui origin).

Names
Town was originally called Karakunuz (sometimes Караконыз or Караконуз), which means "black beetle" in Turkic languages. The Dungans themselves used to refer to Karakunuz as Ingpan, which is an archaic word in Chinese languages for "military camp."

From 1903 to 1918, the town was briefly renamed Nikolaevka after Tsar Nicholas II of Russia. In 1965, Karakunuz was renamed Masanchi (sometimes spelt as "Masanchin"), after Magaza Masanchi or Masanchin (Dungan: Магәзы Масанчын), a Dungan participant in the Communist Revolution and a Soviet Kazakhstan statesman.

Demographics 

According to the 2009 Census, the village of Masanchi had a population of 13,606 people, and the administrative district governing the village had a population of 14,502. The 1999 Census reported populations of 8,926 and 9,608, respectively. Of the 13,606 people in the village, 6,914 people were reported as men, and 6,692 were reported as women.

Ethnic conflict 

On 5 February 2020, a conflict between Kazakhs and Dungans broke out over the alleged beating of an elderly Kazakh man by a Dungan man. The subsequent clashes have reportedly killed 11 dungan, caused the arrest of 47 more, and resulted in damage to local properties.

References 

Populated places in Jambyl Region
Cities and towns in Kazakhstan